Kim Dong-wook (born July 29, 1983) is a South Korean actor. After appearing in student short films and several minor parts, Kim became a star through his supporting role in the popular TV series Coffee Prince (2007), followed by box office hit Take Off (2009). He then starred in Happy Killers (2010), Romantic Heaven (2011), The Guest (2018) and The King of Pigs (TV series) (2022). His acclaimed performance as an obsessed and tormented king in the 2012 period drama The Concubine, along with his appearance in the fantasy action films Along with the Gods 1 and 2 has brought Kim the best reviews of his career yet.

Career 
After officially debuting in A Crimson Mark, Kim Dong-wook's first notable role was the angry, impoverished teenager in director Byun Young-joo's 2004 coming-of-age film Flying Boys. He then broke into the mainstream as the bubbly waiter in MBC's 2007 hit romantic comedy series Coffee Prince.

In the popular 2009 sports flick Take Off, he starred as a former night club bouncer who ends up being a member of Korea's national ski jumping team. In spite of the enormous physical challenge, Kim said it was a character he genuinely enjoyed playing.

His musical theatre debut was in On Air: Season 2, which was produced by his fellow alumni from the Korea National University of Arts. A loose spin-off of the TV series On Air, it takes place at a radio station and centers around an idol singer-turned-DJ and an older female PD. His follow-up the year after was the Korean production of Legally Blonde, the Broadway musical based on the 2011 Hollywood film of the same name. He played Luke Wilson's role Emmett. Kim said "the show must go on, no matter what" mentality was what he found appealing yet tough about doing musicals.

Kim then played lead roles in the omnibus film Five Senses of Eros, thriller Happy Killers, and melodrama Romantic Heaven. But it was his performance in period thriller The Concubine that he gained significant attention on the big screen. 
According to critics one of the finest of achievements of the 2012 period thriller is Kim's engrossing performance as the tormented Prince Sung-won, who gradually loses his sense of judgment and emotional control in the face of obsessive love. Kim said of playing the intense role, "While feeling sorry for him, I also found the complexity of the character fascinating. That's what drew me in."

In 2014, Kim made his acting comeback in the period drama series More Than a Maid. He had his big screen comeback in action comedy Three Summer Nights (2015). Kim then played the leading role in the cable slice-of-life drama Riders: Get Tomorrow (2015), which won him the Best Character Award at the Korea Cable TV Awards.

Kim played a significant role in the fantasy blockbuster Along With the Gods: The Two Worlds (2017) and its sequel, Along with the Gods: The Last 49 Days (2018); which won him several Best Supporting Actor accolades.

Kim was then cast in OCN's supernatural thriller The Guest (2018). The series was a hit and received positive reviews.

In 2019, Kim starred alongside Ko Sung-hee in the romantic comedy film Trade Your Love. In April, Kim is set to star in the comedy drama Special Labor Inspector.

In 2020, Kim was cast in the romance drama Find Me in Your Memory.

In 2021, Kim played the role of a psychiatrist in the new drama You Are My Spring, co-starring with  Seo Hyun-jin.

In 2022, Kim as Hwang Kyung-min, who lives without forgetting the memories of school violence 20 years ago in the web series The King of Pigs.

Personal life
Kim enlisted for his mandatory military service on August 30, 2012 at a training camp in Nonsan, South Chungcheong Province. He underwent five weeks of basic training and served for two years as a riot policeman for the Seoul Metropolitan Police Agency. Kim was discharged on May 29, 2014. He doesn't use social media.

Philanthropy 
On March 8, 2022, Kim donated  million to the Hope Bridge Disaster Relief Association to help the victims of the massive wildfire that started in Uljin, Gyeongbuk and has spread to Samcheok, Gangwon.

Filmography

Film

Television series

Web series

Television shows

Musical theatre

Discography

Singles

Music Video Appearances

Awards and nominations

References

External links 

 
 
 

South Korean male television actors
South Korean male film actors
South Korean male musical theatre actors
South Korean male stage actors
Korea National University of Arts alumni
1983 births
Living people
People from Chuncheon
21st-century South Korean male actors
South Korean male web series actors